The Rigault RP.01B was a French-built high-wing single-engined ultralight aircraft of the 1950s.

Development

The RP.01B was a one-off aircraft which was designed and built by Monsieur Paul Rigault at Mitry-Mory airfield to the NE of Paris. The airfield now forms part of the site of Paris-Charles de Gaulle airport.

The aircraft was fitted with high-set wings which were supported by twin struts, a fixed tailwheel undercarriage and a single seat for the pilot owner. It was powered by a nine-cylinder Salmson 9 ADB air-cooled radial engine. It was of conventional wooden construction with plywood and fabric-covered fuselage and fabric-covered wings and control surfaces.

Operational history

M. Rigault completed the aircraft during 1958 and named it "Le Napalm". He flew it regularly until at least early 1965. The RP.01B is no longer extant.

Specifications (RP.01B)

References
Notes

Bibliography

1950s French civil utility aircraft
High-wing aircraft
Aircraft first flown in 1958